Blaž Puc (Chinese: 普科; 人born 29 January 1978 in Slovenia) is a Slovenian retired footballer.

China

Contributing two goals as Shenyang Ginde eliminated Liaoning from the 2006 Chinese FA Cup with a 2-1 scoreline, Puc was able to collaborate with Guinean Ousmane Bangoura who assisted his goals, but picked up a red card at the conclusion of April which led to a mass brawl with Liaoning, their second matchup with them that season.

Unable to adapt to Shenyang's inclement weather, the Slovene stated that gameplay of the Chinese Super League was very slow and not aggressive.

References

External links 
 at Soccerway

1978 births
Living people
Slovenian footballers
Association football forwards
NK Olimpija Ljubljana (1945–2005) players
NK Bela Krajina players
Diagoras F.C. players